Richard Francis Romanos (28 October 1929 – 21 September 2018) was a New Zealand cricketer who played two first-class matches for Wellington in the 1950s.

Romanos was born in Wellington to parents who had migrated to New Zealand from Lebanon. He attended St Patrick's College in Wellington. 

He played two matches in the Plunket Shield as batsman in the 1951–52 season, but was not successful, scoring 20 runs in all. His son Joseph is a journalist and sports writer.

References

External links
 

1929 births
2018 deaths
People educated at St. Patrick's College, Wellington
Cricketers from Wellington City
New Zealand cricketers
Wellington cricketers
New Zealand people of Lebanese descent
Sportspeople of Lebanese descent